Mariano Silva (born 18 December 1969) is an Argentine former field hockey player who competed in the 1988 Summer Olympics.

References

External links
 

1969 births
Living people
Argentine male field hockey players
Olympic field hockey players of Argentina
Field hockey players at the 1988 Summer Olympics